Edward Ellsworth Springer (1867 – December 17, 1891) was a Major League Baseball pitcher. He played in the majors for the Louisville Colonels of the American Association during the 1889 season. He appeared in one game for the Colonels, pitching five innings on July 12, 1889.

References

External links

1867 births
1891 deaths
19th-century baseball players
Canadian expatriate baseball players in the United States
Hamilton Hams players
Louisville Colonels players
Major League Baseball pitchers
Major League Baseball players from Canada
Sportspeople from Ontario